The African Development Review is devoted to the study and analysis of development policy in Africa. Published four times a year for the African Development Bank, the Review emphasizes policy relevance of research findings, rather than purely theoretical and quantitative issues. According to the Journal Citation Report, the journal had an impact factor of 1.878 in 2020.

References 

 Electronic Journals Library (EZB)
 AtoZ electronic journals focused on Africa (NAI)

External links 
 African Development Review, wiley.com
 African Development Review, ingentaconnect.com

Wiley-Blackwell academic journals
Publications established in 1989
African studies journals